Leah Leneman (3 March 1944 – 26 December 1999) was a popular historian and cookery writer. She wrote about Scottish history including the struggle for women's suffrage.

Biography 
Leah Leneman was born in California of European descent. She grew up in Los Angeles, educated in a private English/Hebrew school. She embarked on an acting career in the early 1960s first in New York, then in Islington, London (Tower Theatre).

Leneman became a vegetarian by the influence of Vedanta movement of Hinduism and later a vegan. She wrote vegan cookery books.

She was also one of the pioneers of women's history in Scotland. She received an adult education class and developed her interest in Scotland's history, and after taking A-level, she enrolled as a mature student at the University of Edinburgh in 1975. She introduced to a wide audience many aspects of Scottish social history from the 17th to the 19th centuries. She worked on Scottish women's history and published many books later.

Publications 

Vegan Cooking: The Compassionate Way of Eating (1982)
 Living in Atholl: a social history of the estates, 1685–1785 (1986)
 Sexuality and Social Control, Scotland 1660–1780 (1989)
 Fit for Heroes: Land settlement in Scotland after World War I (1989)
 In the Service of Life: the story of Elsie Inglis and the Scottish women's hospitals (1994)
 A Guid Cause: the Women's Suffrage Movement in Scotland (1995)
Leah Leneman (1997) The awakened instinct: vegetarianism and the women's suffrage movement in Britain, Women's History Review, 6:2, 271-287
 Sin in the City (1998) 
 Girls in Trouble (1998)
 Alienated Affections: The Scottish Experience of Divorce and Separation, 1684–1830 (1998)
 The Tofu Cookbook: Over 150 Quick and Easy Recipes (1998)
 Vegan Cooking for One: Over 150 Simple and Appetizing Meals (2000)

References 

1944 births
1999 deaths
20th-century American people
20th-century American women
American women historians
Historians of vegetarianism
Vegan cookbook writers